The 2020 TCR Europe Touring Car Series is the fifth season of TCR Europe Touring Car Series. The season will begin at the Circuit de Spa-Francorchamps in April and May and will end at the Circuit de Barcelona-Catalunya in October.

Josh Files is the defending drivers' champion, while Target Competition is the defending teams' champion.

Calendar 
The calendar was announced on 22 May 2020 with 6 rounds scheduled.

Calendar changes 
 After being omitted from the 2019 calendar Circuit Paul Ricard will return to the series, acting as the season opener in the revised calendar.
 The Circuit Zolder will make its first appearance in the series.
 With the addition of Circuit Zolder and Circuit Paul Ricard, the rounds held at the Hungaroring and Hockenheimring were removed from the schedule.

Teams and drivers

Team and driver changes 
 Élite Motorsport will enter two Audi RS 3 LMS TCR cars, for Jacopo Guidetti and another yet to be confirmed driver.
 W Racing Team, which fielded an Audi RS 3 LMS TCR for Santiago Urrutia and an Volkswagen Golf GTI TCR for Maxime Potty in the 2019 season, will not return to the series along with ending their activities in the World Touring Car Cup.
 Brutal Fish Racing will enter the season with a trio of Honda Civic Type R TCR (FK8)s. Pepe Oriola will drive the third car.
 Nicolas Baert, Mehdi Bennani and Sami Taoufik will drive a trio of Comtoyou Racing-entered Audi RS 3 LMS TCRs.
 Argentinean driver José Manuel Sapag will drive for Target Competition.
 Vuković Motorsport will enter two Renault Mégane R.S TCR cars, for Jack Young and another yet to be confirmed driver.
 BRC Racing Team will enter two Hyundai i30 N TCR cars, for Mat'o Homola who moves from Target Competition and Dániel Nagy who moves from M1RA.
 Volcano Motorsport will enter a CUPRA León TCR in selected rounds, for Evgeni Leonov.
 Florian Briché will debut for JSB Compétition in a Peugeot 308 TCR.
 Néstor Girolami will drive in the opening round for PSS Racing Team, replacing Davidovski due to travel bans.
 Tecnodom Sport will make its series debut entering an Audi RS 3 LMS TCR for Kevin Giacon and the Fiat Tipo TCR for Luca Rangoni who will be running as a guest entry as it is not yet a homologated car.
 Felice Jemini will debut for PMA Motorsport in a Hyundai i30 N TCR.

Rule changes

Sporting changes 
The race format is set to be changed for 2020 from 23 minutes + 1 lap to fixed length at 55 kilometers with the first two laps under safety car added to the total race distance similar to the rules set by the World Touring Car Cup. The change was made due to some of the races were mostly spent under safety car. Along with the fixed race distance, a maximum of 30 full-season entries would be allowed.

Results and standings

Season summary

TCR Europe standings

Drivers' standings 
Scoring system

† – Drivers did not finish the race, but were classified as they completed over 75% of the race distance.

Teams' standings

† – Drivers did not finish the race, but were classified as they completed over 75% of the race distance.

TCR BeNeLux Drivers' standings (top 3)

References

External links
 

2020 in European sport
Europe Touring Car Series
Motorsport events postponed due to the COVID-19 pandemic